The women's artistic team competition at the 2010 Asian Games in Guangzhou, China was held on 14 November 2010 at the Asian Games Town Gymnasium. The competition also served as qualification for the individual event finals.

Schedule
All times are China Standard Time (UTC+08:00)

Results

References

Results

External links
Official website

Artistic Women Team